Deza in Iran may refer to:
 Bala Deza
 Pain Deza